Mfundo Cecil Mathonsi (born 27 July 1982) is a South African footballer (striker) who last played for PSAP Sigli.

Career
Mathonsi began playing football with Ajax Cape Town. He signed with Turkish side Altay in August 2002, but only appeared for the reserve team before returning to South Africa in March 2003. He would play for Lamontville Golden Arrows and Maritzburg Classic in the Premier Soccer League.

Mathonsi moved to Indonesia in 2009, helping Persiram Raja Ampat win their group in the second division.

References

External links
Profile at liga-indonesia.co.id

1982 births
Living people
South African expatriate soccer players
South African soccer players
Association football forwards
Cape Town Spurs F.C. players
Lamontville Golden Arrows F.C. players
Maritzburg United F.C. players
Persiram Raja Ampat players
Persita Tangerang players
Expatriate footballers in Indonesia
Liga 1 (Indonesia) players